Endozoicomonas arenosclerae is a bacterium from the genus of Endozoicomonas. Endozoicomonas arenosclerae occur in the flora of the sponge Arenosclera brasiliensis.

References

Oceanospirillales
Bacteria described in 2016